The 1967 Victorian state election was held on 29 April 1967.

Seat changes
Burwood Liberal MLA Jim MacDonald contested Glen Iris.
Caulfield Liberal MLA Ian McLaren contested Bennettswood.
Fitzroy Labor MLA Denis Lovegrove contested Sunshine.
Geelong West Labor MLA Neil Trezise contested Geelong North.
Grant Labor MLA Jack Ginifer contested Deer Park.
Mentone Liberal MLA Edward Meagher contested Frankston.
Moorabbin Liberal MLA Bob Suggett contested Bentleigh.
Mornington Liberal MLA Roberts Dunstan contested Dromana.
Morwell Liberal MLA Jim Balfour contested Narracan.
Mulgrave Liberal MLA Ray Wiltshire contested Syndal.
Ormond Liberal MLA Joe Rafferty contested Glenhuntly.
Ripponlea Liberal MLA Edgar Tanner contested Caulfield.
Scoresby Liberal MLA Bill Borthwick contested Monbulk.
Higinbotham Liberal MLC Lindsay Thompson contested Monash Province.
Southern Liberal MLC Gilbert Chandler contested Boronia Province.

Retiring Members

Labor
Kevin Holland MLA (Flemington)
Charlie Mutton MLA (Coburg)
Roy Schintler MLA (Yarraville)

Liberal
Richard Gainey MLA (Elsternwick)
Philip Hudson MLA (Toorak)
Charles Gawith MLC (Monash)
Thomas Grigg MLC (Bendigo)

Legislative Assembly
Sitting members are shown in bold text. Successful candidates are highlighted in the relevant colour. Where there is possible confusion, an asterisk (*) is also used.

Legislative Council
Sitting members are shown in bold text. Successful candidates are highlighted in the relevant colour. Where there is possible confusion, an asterisk (*) is also used.

References

Psephos - Adam Carr's Election Archive

Victoria
Candidates for Victorian state elections